Rychlik or Rychlík (Czech feminine: Rychlíková) is a surname. Notable people with the surname include:

 Břetislav Rychlík (born 1958), Czech actor
 Jan Rychlík (1916–1964), Czech composer
 Jiří Rychlík (born 1977), Czech footballer
 Karel Rychlík (1885–1968), Czech mathematician
 Marek R. Rychlik
 Piotr Rychlik (born 1984), Polish diplomat
 Wojciech Rychlik, Polish-American biologist and photographer

See also
 

Czech-language surnames
Polish-language surnames